Boudu is a 2005 French comedy film directed by Gérard Jugnot. It is a remake of Jean Renoir's 1932 film, Boudu Saved from Drowning.

Cast 
 Gérard Depardieu - Boudu
 Catherine Frot - Yseult
 Gérard Jugnot - Christian
 Constance Dollé - Coralie
 Bonnafet Tarbouriech - Perez
 Hubert Saint-Macary - Bob
 Jean-Paul Rouve - Hubert
 Serge Riaboukine - Géronimo
 Dominique Ratonnat - Le médecin
 Jean-Pierre Foucault - Himself

References

External links 

2005 comedy films
2005 films
French comedy films
Remakes of French films
French films based on plays
Films directed by Gérard Jugnot
Films about poverty in France
2000s French films